William Prescott Wells (December 7, 1931 – December 25, 2001) was an American football halfback who played in the National Football League (NFL) for the Washington Redskins, Pittsburgh Steelers, and the Philadelphia Eagles.  He also played in the American Football League (AFL) for the Boston Patriots.  Wells played college football at Michigan State University and was drafted in the fifth round of the 1954 NFL Draft.

Wells later moved to Southern California.  He formed a Dixieland band called Billy and his Bachelors.  He also acted in a few television shows including Manhunt and Alfred Hitchcock Presents.  Wells died on Christmas Day, December 25, 2001, just  weeks after his 70th birthday.

References

External links
 
 

1931 births
2001 deaths
American football halfbacks
Boston Patriots players
Michigan State Spartans football players
Philadelphia Eagles players
Pittsburgh Steelers players
Washington Redskins players
Eastern Conference Pro Bowl players
People from Menominee, Michigan
Players of American football from Michigan